The 2013–14 season was Al Ain Football Club's 40th in existence and the club's 38th consecutive season in the top-level football league in the UAE.

Club

Current technical staff

Other information

Kits
Supplier: Nike / Sponsor: First Gulf Bank / Abu Dhabi Airports

Season overview

June
Al Ain started summer transfer window signing central midfielder Sultan Al Ghaferi for a three-year deal after the end of his contract with Baniyas. On 11 June, Ivorian central midfielder Ibrahim Diaky was officially presented as an Al Ain player at the press conference for two seasons in exchange deal with Al Jazira of joining Musallam Fayez and Yaqoub Al Hosani along with €1 million. On 17 June, Al Ain announced the end of contract Abdullah Malallah and agreed to terminate the contract with Mohamed Malallah. On 30 June, Saif Mohammed signed a two-year loan extension with Al Dhafra.

July
On 3 July, manager Cosmin Olaroiu moved to manage Al Ain's bitter rivals Al Ahli. On 16 July, it was announced at a press conference the extension of contracts Helal Saeed, Mohanad Salem and Ismail Ahmed. Goalkeeper Khalid Essa moved to Al Ain in undisclosed deal. Hazza Salem, Bandar Al Ahbabi, Yousif Abdelrahman returned to Al Ain after the end of their loans. On 25 July, Al Ain announced that Jorge Fossati will be appointed as the new manager for a one-year deal. On 31 July, Al Dhafra announced signing Al Ain goalkeeper Abdulla Sultan for 5 seasons in undisclosed deal. The 27-year-old leaves after 3 season with the first team.

August
On 1 August, Al Ain announced reached an agreement with Lyon over the transfer of Brazilian midfielder, Michel Bastos. Reportedly Al Ain agree to pay €4 million fee for Bastos. On 30 August Al Ain FC were defeated by Al Ahli on penalties after a 0–0 in the 2013 UAE Super Cup at the Mohammed Bin Zayed Stadium.

September
On 4 September, Al Ain kicked off League Cup with a disappointing 3–1 away loss to Baniyas. On 7 September, Jires Kembo Ekoko joined Qatari club El Jaish for a one-season loan. After two defeats in a row, Al Ain confidently win The Derby a 3–0 over Al Wahda. On 13 September, Al Ain sack Jorge Fossati after seven weeks, due his philosophy and style of play did not suitable with the team and assigned temporarily Ahmed Abdullah, reserve team manager. On 27 September, Quique Flores arrived at Al Ain on Friday to be the new coach on a two-year deal.

October

November

December

January

February

March

April

May

Players

First Team

From Reserve and Youth Academy

Transfers

In 

Total spending:  €5.05 million + Yaqoub Al Hosani, Musallem Fayez

Out 

Total income:  €6.05 million

Pre-season and friendlies

Competitions

Overview

Arabian Gulf League

League table

Results summary

Results by round

Matches

Last updated: 9 May 2014Source: AGLeague.ae

Super Cup

President's Cup

League Cup

Group stage

Group A

Matches

Last updated: 17 November 2013Source: AGLeague.ae

AFC Champions League

Group stage

Group C

Knockout phase

Round of 16

Al-Ain won 4–2 on aggregate.

Quarter-finals

Al-Ain won 5–1 on aggregate.

Semi-finals

Al-Hilal won 4–2 on aggregate.

Statistics

Squad, appearances and goals

Squad Stats
{|class="wikitable" style="text-align: center;"
|-
!
! style="width:70px;"|League
! style="width:70px;"|Asia
! style="width:70px;"|Cup
! style="width:70px;"|League Cup
! style="width:70px;"|Super cup
! style="width:70px;"|Total Stats
|-
|align=left| Games played          || 26 || 12 || 4 || 6 || 1 || 49
|-
|align=left| Games won             || 12 || 8 || 4 || 3 || 0 || 27
|-
|align=left| Games drawn           || 7 || 2 || 0 || 1 || 0 || 10
|-
|align=left| Games lost            || 7 || 2 || 0 || 2 || 1 || 12
|-
|align=left| Goals for             || 52 || 25 || 9 || 11 || 0 || 97
|-
|align=left| Goals against         || 33 || 14 || 4 || 9 || 0 || 60
|-
|align=left| Yellow cards          || 51 || 17 || 11 || 15 || 4 || 98
|-
|align=left| Red cards             || 4 || 2 || 0 || 0 || 0 || 6
|-

Goalscorers
{| class="wikitable" style="font-size: 100%; text-align: center;"
|-
!width=20|
!width=20|
!width=20|
!width=200|Player
!width=50|League
!width=50|League Cup
!width=50|President's Cup
!width=50|Champions League
!width=50|Super Cup
!width=50|Total
|-
|1
|3
|FW
|align="left"|  Asamoah Gyan
|29||||6||12||||47
|-
|2
|16
|FW
|align="left"| Mohamed Abdulrahman
|1||3||||3||||7
|-
|—
|32
|FW
|align="left"| Alex Brosque
|4||1||1||1||||7
|-
|—
|18
|MF
|align="left"| Ibrahim Diaky
|1||3|||||3|||||7
|-
|6
|8
|MF
|align="left"| Michel Bastos
|4||1||||||||5
|-
|7
|19
|DF
|align="left"| Mohanad Salem
|4||||||||||4
|-
|—
|5
|DF
|align="left"| Ismail Ahmed
|3||||||1||||4
|-
|8
|44
|DF
|align="left"| Fares Juma
|2||1||||||||3
|-
|—
|10
|MF
|align="left"| Omar Abdulrahman
|1||||||2||||3
|-
|9
|9
|FW
|align="left"| Kembo Ekoko
|||||||1||||1
|-
|—
|29
|MF
|align="left"| Lee Myung-joo
|||||||1||||1
|-
|—
|43
|MF
|align="left"| Rayan Yaslam
|1||||||||||1
|-
|—
|8
|FW
|align="left"| Yassine El Ghanassy
|1||||||||||1
|-
|—
|4
|MF
|align="left"|  Sultan Al Ghaferi
|||1||||||||1
|-
|—
|6
|MF
|align="left"| Mirel Radoi
|||1||||||||1
|-
|—
|31
|DF
|align="left"| Hazza Salem
|1||||||||||1
|-
|colspan="4"|Own Goals
|||||1||1||||2
|-
|colspan="4"|TOTALS
|52||11||8||25||||96

Assists
{| class="wikitable" style="font-size: 90%; text-align: center;"
|-
!
! style="width:180px;"|Player
!Position
!League
!League Cup
!President's Cup
!Champions League
!Super Cup
!Total
|-
| style="text-align:center;" rowspan="1"|1
|align="left"|  Omar Abdulrahman
|align=center|
|align=center|17
|align=center|0
|align=center|2
|align=center|4
|align=center|0
|align=center|23
|-
| style="text-align:center;" rowspan="1"|2
|align="left"|  Ahmed Al Shamisi
|align=center|
|align=center|4
|align=center|1
|align=center|0
|align=center|0
|align=center|0
|align=center|5
|-
| style="text-align:center;" rowspan="3"|3
|align="left"|  Ibrahim Diaky
|align=center|
|align=center|0
|align=center|1
|align=center|0
|align=center|3
|align=center|0
|align=center|4
|-
|align="left"|  Yassine El Ghanassy
|align=center|
|align=center|4
|align=center|0
|align=center|0
|align=center|1
|align=center|0
|align=center|4
|-
|align="left"|  Asamoah Gyan
|align=center|
|align=center|2
|align=center|0
|align=center|0
|align=center|2
|align=center|0
|align=center|4
|-
| style="text-align:center;" rowspan="3"|6
|align="left"|  Mohamed Abdulrahman
|align=center|
|align=center|2
|align=center|0
|align=center|0
|align=center|1
|align=center|0
|align=center|3
|-
|align="left"|  Michel Bastos
|align=center|
|align=center|3
|align=center|0
|align=center|0
|align=center|0
|align=center|0
|align=center|3
|-
|align="left"|  Mohammed Fayez
|align=center|
|align=center|1
|align=center|0
|align=center|0
|align=center|2
|align=center|0
|align=center|3
|-
| style="text-align:center;" rowspan="3"|9
|align="left"|  Khaled Abdulrahman
|align=center|
|align=center|2
|align=center|0
|align=center|0
|align=center|0
|align=center|0
|align=center|2
|-
|align="left"|  Alex Brosque
|align=center|
|align=center|2
|align=center|0
|align=center|0
|align=center|0
|align=center|0
|align=center|2
|-
|align="left"|  Mirel Rădoi
|align=center|
|align=center|1
|align=center|0
|align=center|0
|align=center|1
|align=center|0
|align=center|2
|-
| style="text-align:center;" rowspan="2"|12
|align="left"|  Abdulsalam Mohammed
|align=center|
|align=center|0
|align=center|1
|align=center|0
|align=center|0
|align=center|0
|align=center|1
|-
|align="left"|  Ismail Ahmed
|align=center|
|align=center|0
|align=center|0
|align=center|0
|align=center|1
|align=center|0
|align=center|1

Disciplinary record

References

External links
 Al Ain FC official website 

2013-14
Emirati football clubs 2013–14 seasons